Achill station served Achill in County Mayo, Ireland and was the terminus of the line which connected to Westport via Mallaranny (Mulranny) and Newport.

History
It was opened by the Midland Great Western Railway in 1895, which was amalgamated into the Great Southern Railway in 1924, and closed in 1937.

The station is now a hostel and the route to Westport was used for the Great Western Greenway trail.

References

External links
 Industrial Heritage Ireland - Achill Railway Station
  MGWR Railway History
 Westport to Achill railway, The Institution of Engineers of Ireland

Midland Great Western Railway
Disused railway stations in County Mayo
Achill Island
Railway stations opened in 1895
Railway stations closed in 1937